LisH domain-containing protein ARMC9 is a protein that in humans is encoded by the ARMC9 gene.

References

External links

Further reading 

 
 
 
 
 
 

Armadillo-repeat-containing proteins